Gasperino Cinelli' (born 3 January 1982 in Italy) is an Italian retired footballer.

Early life

Career
At the age of 17, Cinelli was named best player at the 1999 Torneo di Viareggio, the most prestigious youth tournament in Italy. At the time, he was considered to be one of the best prospects in Italy and was compared to former S.S. Lazio players Vincenzo D'Amico as well as Alen Bokšić, both forwards. However, he could not handle the pressure and was playing in the Italian amateur fifth division by 2005, at the age of 23.

Personal life

Achievements and honours

References

External links
 

1982 births
Living people
A.S.D. Igea Virtus Barcellona players
Association football forwards
Association football wingers
Italian footballers
Latina Calcio 1932 players
Ternana Calcio players